Cambodia competed at the 2000 Summer Olympics in Sydney, Australia.

Athletics

Men

Women

Swimming 

Men

Women

References
Official Olympic Reports
sports-reference

Nations at the 2000 Summer Olympics
2000
Olympic Games